Mahuva may refer to the following places in Gujarat, western India:

 Mahuva, Bhavnagar, on Saurashtra peninsula
 Mahuva, Bhavnagar (Vidhan Sabha constituency), an assembly constituency encompassing the above town.
 Mahuva Junction railway station
 Mahuva, Surat
 Mahuva, Surat (Vidhan Sabha constituency), an assembly constituency encompassing the above town.
 Mowa State, a former princely state in Kathiawar

See also 
 Mahuwa (disambiguation), places in Nepal
 Mahwa (disambiguation)